Events from the year 1906 in Russia.

Incumbents
 Monarch – Nicholas II
 Chairman of the Council of Ministers – 
 until 5 May – Sergei Witte
 5 May–21 July – Ivan Logginovich Goremykin
 starting 21 July – Pyotr Arkadyevich Stolypin
Pyotr Stolypin, Russian prime minister from 1906 to 1911.

Events

 Russian Constitution of 1906
 1906 Russian legislative election
 Markovo Republic
 Białystok pogrom
 Bloody Wednesday (Poland)
 Siedlce pogrom
 Vyborg Manifesto

Births

 19 December - Leonid Brezhnev, Soviet statesman (b. 1906).

Deaths

 June 14 - Sophia Amirajibi, Georgian poetry translator (b. 1847)

References

1906 in the Russian Empire
Years of the 20th century in the Russian Empire